Deobhog is a tehsil in Gariaband district in the Chhattisgarh State of India. It is located at an average elevation of 254 meters above sea level. The area is populated with about 271 people per square km.

Deobhog has dense forest areas. It is also a low impact earthquake zone, with occurrences of earthquakes at <5 Richter. When an earthquake occurs, it may be felt indoors by many people, outdoors by a few people during the day. At night, some people may be awakened. There is an extremely high occurrence of periods with extreme drought.

Deobhog is a mining site with ample alexandrite and garnet reserves. Alexandrite is mined at Sandmura,LaTapara and garnet is mined at Gohekala, Dhupkot and Thirliguda villages of Deobhog Tehsil.

Tehsils of Chhattisgarh